The 1873 New Jersey State Senate elections were held in November.

The elections took place during the final year of Governor Joel Parker's second non-consecutive term in office. Republicans gained the Hunterdon County seat.

Incumbents not running for re-election

Democratic 
 David H. Banghart (Hunterdon)
 Henry A. Williams (Passaic)
 Richard E. Edsall (Sussex)

Republican 
 Henry J. Irick (Burlington)
 Thomas Beesley Sr. (Cape May)

Summary of results by county

Burlington

Cape May

Hunterdon

Middlesex

Passaic

Sussex

References 

New Jersey State Senate elections
New Jersey State Senate